was a town located in Wake District, Okayama Prefecture, Japan.

As of 2003, the town had an estimated population of 4,024 and a density of 66.69 persons per km² (172.73 persons per square mile).

On March 1, 2006, Saeki was merged into the expanded town of Wake.

Dissolved municipalities of Okayama Prefecture